Empress Guo (1012–1035) was a Chinese empress consort of the Song Dynasty, married to Emperor Renzong of Song.

Guo was from Yingxiang and the granddaughter of the regional commandant Guo Chong. She was chosen for the position as Empress consort for the child Emperor Renzong by the Regent Dowager Empress Liu in 1024. Guo was ignored by Renzong, who preferred the palace woman Zhang.

In 1033, her protector Empress Dowager Liu died, and Emperor Renzong was free to govern. Furious at the late Empress Dowager Liu for having passed herself of as his mother, he turned against her former allies, who now formed around Empress Guo.  Empress Guo managed to have Grand Chancellor Lü Yijian exiled, but within a year, he returned and encouraged the emperor to divorce her.  
The divorce cause was an argument between Empress Guo and two other women, Consort Yang and Consort Shang. The women provoked Guo until she reached out to slap them: when she did, however, they moved, which caused her slap to land upon the emperor. He then deposed her on the grounds of violence.  
The deposition of Empress Guo caused a conflict between the emperor and his ministers, who warned him that his divorce was unfilial and that it would undermine the position of an Empress and set an unacceptable precedent if in future an Emperor could depose an Empress, the mother of the people, merely for personal reasons.   

Empress Guo died a mysterious death in 1035. One year later, the emperor sent Consort Yang and Consort Shang to a nunnery, and in 1037, he restored Guo to the rank of Empress.

Notes

1012 births
1035 deaths
Song dynasty empresses
11th-century Chinese women
11th-century Chinese people